Louis Foster (born 27 July 2003) is a British racing driver. He currently competes in  Indy NXT driving for Andretti Autosport. He is the 2022 Indy Pro 2000 champion. Foster previously competed in the 2021 Euroformula Open Championship with CryptoTower Racing and the 2020 BRDC British Formula 3 Championship with Double R Racing where he finished third.

Personal life 
Louis is the son of former British Touring Car Championship racer Nick Foster. He attended Lord Wandsworth College in Hook, Hampshire. Foster is also a keen hockey and rugby player.

Career

Ginetta Junior Championship 
Foster made his car racing debut in the final three meetings of the 2017 Ginetta Junior Championship, driving with Elite Motorsport. He then competed in that year's Ginetta Junior Winter Series, where he won the Rookie Championship.

He returned to the championship in 2018 and was a persistent title contender throughout the season. Foster claimed 19 podiums, of which 9 were victories plus four pole positions and two fastest laps on his way to second place in the championship. He scored the most points of any driver but lost out on the title by just eight points to teammate Adam Smalley after dropped scores were accounted for.

During the campaign, Foster accrued several records; the first rookie to win three races in one weekend, the first driver to win five races in succession and the youngest driver to score an outright victory.

F4 British Championship 
Following his successful stint in Ginetta Juniors, Foster moved to single-seaters when he joined Double R Racing for the 2019 F4 British Championship certified by FIA, powered by Ford EcoBoost season. In February 2019, Foster received sponsorship from global used car dealership Copart.

Foster was immediately on the pace, taking victory in only the second race of the season. He followed that with a sublime weekend in Donington, winning two races and scoring a third-place finish in the other to give him a 17-point lead in the championship table.

Across the rest of the season, Foster accrued another three wins and nine podium finishes - dominating at Silverstone – to finish the year third in the championship, remaining in the title hunt until the season finale weekend at Brands Hatch.

BRDC F3 Championship 
For 2020, Foster graduated to the BRDC British F3 Championship, remaining with Double R Racing. The opening round at Oulton Park, scheduled for 11 and 13 April, was postponed due to the COVID-19 pandemic.

The season subsequently began at Oulton Park on the 1st and 2 August. In the opening qualifying session of the year, Louis set the benchmark and claimed double pole position in his debut weekend in the series. He followed his qualifying success with a maiden podium finish.

Moving on to Donington Park, Foster claimed his first win the series with a mature drive from the front-row of the grid. He then claimed a string of top-ten finishes, including climbing ten places from 18th to 8th in the second race at Donington.

Further success came at Brands Hatch when Foster scored three top-six finishes, including a third-place podium in the final race. The 17-year-old carried this momentum into the series' second visit to Donington Park, where he claimed another race victory, this time climbing from sixth on the grid, alongside two 11th-place finishes.

Snetterton marked Foster's most successful weekend in the series to date as the Hampshire racer took his second double pole position of the season before converting those into his third win of the year and a further second-place podium alongside fourth and fifth in the additional two races. It also meant Foster took the lead of the Jack Cavill Pole Position Cup.

Euroformula Open 

It was announced in October 2020 that Foster would make his debut in Euroformula Open at Circuit de Spa-Francorchamps. Competing with Double R Racing once again, Foster quickly found himself on the pace as he gained four places in the opening race to break into the top ten. Qualifying fifth for the second race, Foster launched himself to third on the first lap and put himself in prime position to take victory in only his second race in the series.

Shortly after making his debut at Spa-Francorchamps, it was announced that Foster would also contest the rescheduled season finale at Circuit de Barcelona-Catalunya, with the track hosting four races in lieu of the cancelled round at Circuito del Jarama. After qualifying 11th, 10th, 4th and 12th, Foster pulled off a number of daring overtakes in races one and two to climb into the top ten, finishing eighth in both races. Starting from fourth in race three, the 17-year-old leapfrogged two cars on the first lap to take second place and another podium finish in the series, coming within touching distance of the win. 

In 2021, Foster switched to CryptoTower Racing to contest the full season. He took pole position at the first round at Portimão and finished in the podium in races 1 and 3, with his brake disc exploding on the formation lap in race 2. Foster secured another two podiums at the second round at Paul Ricard before going on to take a triple win at the third round of the championship at Spa-Francorchamps.

In September, for finishing as Euroformula Open vice champion, Foster was nominated for the Autosport BRDC Award.

Indy Pro 2000 
Earlier in 2021, Foster ran in a private test with Jay Howard Driver Development and later ran in the Chris Griffis Memorial Test with Exclusive Autosport, setting the fastest time of the test. For the 2022 season, Foster signed to drive for Exclusive Autosport for the full season. A dominant season insued, as the Briton won seven races, taking the title at the final round at Portland.

Formula Regional 
During his 2023 pre-season, Browning joined the 2023 Formula Regional Oceania Championship with Giles Motorsport for the final three rounds.

Indy NXT 
Following his Indy Pro Championship victory, Foster was announced to be signing for Andretti Autosport for the 2023 Indy NXT season.

Racing record

Career summary

* Season still in progress.

Complete F4 British Championship results
(key) (Races in bold indicate pole position) (Races in italics indicate fastest lap)

Complete BRDC British Formula 3 Championship results
(key) (Races in bold indicate pole position) (Races in italics indicate fastest lap)

Complete Euroformula Open Championship results 
(key) (Races in bold indicate pole position; races in italics indicate points for the fastest lap of top ten finishers)

Complete Formula Regional Oceania Championship Results
(key) (Races in bold indicate pole position) (Races in italics indicate fastest lap)

American open-wheel racing results

Indy Pro 2000 Championship 
(key) (Races in bold indicate pole position) (Races in italics indicate fastest lap) (Races with * indicate most race laps led)

Indy NXT
(key) (Races in bold indicate pole position) (Races in italics indicate fastest lap) (Races with L indicate a race lap led) (Races with * indicate most race laps led)

References

External links 
 

2003 births
Living people
English racing drivers
British F4 Championship drivers
Ginetta Junior Championship drivers
People educated at Lord Wandsworth College
MRF Challenge Formula 2000 Championship drivers
BRDC British Formula 3 Championship drivers
Euroformula Open Championship drivers
Indy Pro 2000 Championship drivers
Double R Racing drivers
Motopark Academy drivers
Indy Lights drivers
Andretti Autosport drivers
Toyota Racing Series drivers